Maximiscin is a polyketide-shikimate chemical compound isolated from Tolypocladium that shows tumor growth suppression in an animal model.  The discovery of maximiscin was the result of a citizen scientist crowdsourcing project by the University of Oklahoma.  The soil sample which yielded maximiscin was sent by a woman from Salcha, Alaska.

References

Methyl esters
Lactams
Polyketides
Cyclohexenes